Francisco de la Serna, O.E.S.A. (1568 – April 1647) was a Roman Catholic prelate who served as Bishop of La Paz (1645–1647), Bishop of Popayán (1638–1645), and Bishop of Paraguay (1635–1638).

Biography
Francisco de la Serna was born in Huanuco, Peru in 1568 and ordained a priest in the Order of Hermits of Saint Augustine on 9 June 1596.
On 17 December 1635, he was appointed during the papacy of Pope Urban VIII as Bishop of Paraguay. 
On 15 November 1637, he was consecrated bishop by Hernando de Arias y Ugarte, Archbishop of Lima, assisted by Father Pedro de Ortega y Sotomayor.  
On 14 June 1638, he was appointed during the papacy of Pope Urban VIII as Bishop of Popayán.  
On 19 January 1645, he was selected by the King of Spain and confirmed by Pope Innocent X on 21 August 1645 as Bishop of La Paz.  
He died in April 1647.

While bishop, he was the principal consecrator of Gaspar de Villarroel, Bishop of Santiago de Chile (1638); and the principal co-consecrator of Bartolomé de Benavente y Benavides, Bishop of Antequera, Oaxaca (1640).

References

External links and additional sources
 (for Chronology of Bishops) 
 (for Chronology of Bishops) 
 (for Chronology of Bishops) 
 (for Chronology of Bishops) 
 (for Chronology of Bishops) 
 (for Chronology of Bishops)  

17th-century Roman Catholic bishops in Bolivia
Bishops appointed by Pope Urban VIII
Bishops appointed by Pope Innocent X
Augustinian bishops
People from Huánuco
1568 births
1647 deaths
Roman Catholic bishops of Paraguay
Roman Catholic bishops of Popayán
Roman Catholic bishops of La Paz